The ARIA Streaming Chart ranks the best-performing streaming tracks of Australia. It is published by Australian Recording Industry Association (ARIA), an organisation who collects music data for the weekly ARIA Charts.

Chart history

Number-one artists

See also
2017 in music
ARIA Charts
List of number-one singles of 2017 (Australia)

References

Australia Streaming
Streaming 2017
Number-one Streaming Songs